Poli Kan (also Romanized as Polī Kān; also known as Palakān and Pīleh Kān) is a village in Darjazin-e Olya Rural District, Qorveh-e Darjazin District, Razan County, Hamadan Province, Iran. At the 2006 census, its population was 89, in 18 families.

References 

Populated places in Razan County